The Sword of Damocles is a symbolic sword from the Greek parable about the fictional courtier Damocles.

Sword of Damocles may also refer to:

Music
 "The Sword of Damocles", a song from the 1973 musical The Rocky Horror Show
 "Sword of Damocles Externally", a song by Lou Reed from the 1992 album Magic and Loss
 "Sword of Damocles", a song from the 2014 Judas Priest album Redeemer of Souls
 "Sword of Damocles" (Rufus Wainwright song), 2018

Film and television
 The Sword of Damocles (film), a 1920 British silent film directed by George Ridgwell
 Sword of Damocles, a super weapon in the 1996 movie Escape from L.A.
 "Sword of Damocles" marking each of the kings in the Japanese TV series K

Other
 The Sword of Damocles (virtual reality), the first virtual reality system

See also
 Damocles (disambiguation)